Murphreesboro (also New Hope) is a ghost town in Tallahatchie County, Mississippi, United States.

Ascalmore Creek flowed through the settlement.

Murphreesboro had a post office and a school.  In 1900, the population was 56.

Blues guitarist Hayes McMullen was born in Murphreesboro in 1902.

References

Former populated places in Tallahatchie County, Mississippi
Former populated places in Mississippi